The  opened near Gangō-ji in Nara, Japan, in 1993. The large cornerstone in the courtyard is thought to be from the Gangō-ji shōrō.

See also
 Nara National Museum
 List of Cultural Properties of Japan - historical materials (Nara)
 List of Historic Sites of Japan (Nara)
 Kyoto City Library of Historical Documents

References

External links
  Historical Materials Preservation House

Museums in Nara, Nara
Museums established in 1993
1993 establishments in Japan